The Pan American Women's Youth Handball Championship was the official competition for youth women's national handball teams of Americas, and took place every two years. In addition to crowning the Pan American champions, the tournament also served as a qualifying tournament for the Youth World Championship. In 2018, the PATHF was deprived of recognition and the tournament was replaced with the IHF Trophy for North America and the Caribbean, and the South and Central American Women's Youth Handball Championship.

Summary

Medal table

Participating nations

References

External links
 www.panamhandball.org

 
Recurring sporting events established in 2001
Recurring sporting events disestablished in 2018
Pan-American Team Handball Federation competitions